Niv Fichman (born 1958) is an Israeli-Canadian film producer, actor and director.

Some of the films he has produced include Passchendaele, Blindness, Silk, Long Day's Journey into Night, The Red Violin, Thirty Two Short Films About Glenn Gould and Hobo With a Shotgun.

References

External links

 Cynthia Amsden, Niv Fichman: skipping class to make movies, Take One, September 1, 2002
 Fichman, Niv, on York University Library
 Oscar-winner Niv Fichman picks up producer award at TIFF, CBC News, September 7, 2007
 Bobby McGill, Interview: My Lunch with Niv Fichman, Haps, October 9, 2012

1958 births
Israeli emigrants to Canada
Jewish Canadian male actors
Canadian film directors
Canadian film producers
Living people
People from Tel Aviv
Jewish Canadian filmmakers